Charles Eldredge may refer to:
Charles A. Eldredge, American politician
Charles C. Eldredge, American art historian

See also
Charles Eldridge